Jesús Alexandro Amarilla Solís (born 26 August 2001) is a Paraguayan footballer who plays as an attacking midfielder.

Career

Club career
On 22 April 2018, 16-year old Amarilla got his official debut for Club Libertad against Club Guaraní in the Paraguayan Primera División. He made a total of eight appearances for Libertad in that season. In the following season, he made six appearances, mostly playing for the clubs reserve team.

References

External links
 

Living people
2001 births
Association football midfielders
Paraguayan footballers
Paraguayan Primera División players
Club Libertad footballers
Sportspeople from Asunción